The FACEIT Major: London 2018, also known as FACEIT Major 2018, or London 2018, was the thirteenth Counter-Strike: Global Offensive Major Championship, the second Major of 2018, and first organized by FACEIT. It featured twenty-four professional teams from around the world and  took place in London, United Kingdom. The group stages were held in Twickenham Stadium, and the playoffs were played in front of a live crowd in the SSE Arena, Wembley. The London Major was the sixth consecutive major with a prize pool of $1,000,000. The top sixteen teams from the previous Major, Boston 2018, automatically qualified for the FACEIT Major while another eight teams qualified from their respective regional qualifiers. The eight from regional qualifiers and the bottom eight teams from Boston 2018 (together called the "Challengers") competed in the New Challengers group stage, a Swiss-system tournament. The top eight from this stage then advanced to face the top eight teams from Boston ("Legends") in a second Swiss-system group stage, the New Legends stage. The top eight from this stage advanced to the playoffs.

FaZe Clan, MIBR, and Natus Vincere were the only incoming Legends to retain their Legend status at this Major by advancing to the playoff stage. Team Liquid, compLexity Gaming, BIG, HellRaisers, and Astralis were new Legends. Defending champions Cloud9, along with mousesports, Fnatic, G2 Esports, and Winstrike Team, were knocked out in the New Legends stage, thus losing their Legends status. Fnatic failed to advance to the playoffs for the first time in the team's history; the organization had been a Legend at every Major until London. This also ended Freddy "KRiMZ" Johansson's run as one of the only players to attend every Major and become Legends. This left Olof "olofmeister" Kajbjer as the only player to become a Legend at every Major in CS:GO history, and MIBR as the only team to be Legends at every Major it had attended. This Major was also significant in that no majority-Swedish team became Legends after Ninjas in Pyjamas fell to MIBR in the New Legends stage. Cloud9 also became the second team in CS:GO history to lose its Legends status after winning the previous Major, along with Team EnVyUs.

The grand finals pitted Natus Vincere and Astralis against each other. Natus Vincere defeated BIG in the quarterfinals and MIBR in the semifinals while Astralis defeated FaZe Clan and Team Liquid respectively. In a fairly convincing two map sweep, Astralis took down Natus Vincere for its second Major championship to draw level with MIBR and the former Team EnVyUs French core for the second most Major titles.

Background

Counter-Strike: Global Offensive (CS:GO) is a multiplayer first-person shooter video game developed by Hidden Path Entertainment and Valve. It is the fourth game in the Counter-Strike series. In professional CS:GO, the Valve-sponsored Majors are the most prestigious tournaments.

The defending champion was Cloud9, which became the first North American team to win a Major and just the third non-European team to win a Major. The Swedish team Fnatic attended as the most decorated CS:GO team in Major history, with three wins.

Format
FACEIT largely retained the Major format from Boston 2018 that had been announced by Valve and ELEAGUE, where the offline qualifier that had taken place before early Majors was rebranded as the "New Challengers stage" and became an official part of the full Major. Apart from this, the competitive format had remained nearly constant since implementing the 16-team Swiss system over the GSL format at ELEAGUE Major 2017.

The Major cycle began with four Minors, or regional qualifiers: Americas, Asia, CIS, and Europe. Two teams from each qualifier moved on to the New Challengers stage. The New Challengers stage featured sixteen teams: the bottom eight teams from the previous Major's New Legends stage and the eight teams from the Minors. These teams played in a sixteen team, Swiss-system format. The top eight teams from this stage moved on to the next stage of the Major, the "New Legends stage".

The 16-team New Legends stage, which replaced the old group stage, featured the eight teams advancing from the New Challengers stage and the eight Legends from the Boston Major. Like the New Challengers stage, the New Legends stage used a 16-team, Swiss-system format. The top eight teams from this stage moved on to the playoff bracket and gained Legend status for the following Major.

FACEIT's format for the New Challengers and the New Legends stages made few adjustments to the Boston format. In round five of each Swiss group stage, the remaining six teams played a best-of-three instead of the previous best-of-one. In addition, the group stage used the Buchholz system for seeding the Swiss-system, rather than random draw. In FACEIT's Buchholz system, the teams with the hardest strength of schedule earned the higher seeds after the first round; strength of schedule is determined by how many wins the team's opponent has had.

In the playoffs, now known as the "New Champions stage," eight teams played in a single elimination, best-of-three bracket. FACEIT also made slight changes to the New Champions stage. Rather than randomizing the teams with the same records, these playoffs seeded teams based on how difficult their opponents in the group stage had been. This was determined by adding up opponent wins from the New Legends stage.

Map pool
On April 20, 2018, Valve announced that the revamped Dust II would be replacing Cobblestone in the Active Duty map pool, changing the map pool from Boston 2018.

Regional qualifiers
Each regional qualifier, called "Minors", featured eight teams, whether through direct invitation or through qualifiers. Each minor featured two groups of four teams; these groups were in GSL double elimination formats, which was the format used at every major until the ELEAGUE Major, with the initial matches and winners match being best of ones and the losers and decider series being best of three. Two teams of each group qualify for the bracket phase, which is a four team, double elimination, best of three bracket. Two teams qualify for the major qualifier from each minor.

Each minor also had a 50,000 prize pool with first place receiving 30,000, second place taking in 15,000, and third place raking in the last 5,000. In addition, all four minors will be held in London at the Twickenham Stadium to combat any last minute visa issues before the actual Major starts.

Asia Minor
The Asia Minor ran from July 16 to July 20. Two teams were invited to the Asia Minor, unlike the last Asia Minor, in which all eight teams were invited. Two teams qualified from the Southeast Asia qualifier (which includes India), one team from the East Asia qualifier, one team from the Middle East qualifier, one team from the Oceania qualifier, and one team from the China qualifier. Each open Asian regional qualifier was a single elimination bracket.

Controversy ensued in the China qualifier. Fierce Tiger had won the China qualifier via forfeit from VG.FlashGaming due to the latter's internet issues. VG.Flash suspected that its internet had been "sabotaged" before the match was about to start. FACEIT decided that the match would be replayed. Fierce Tiger was unhappy with the decision, saying that VG.Flash should be held accountable for its own issues and that its players were already on vacation. Fierce Tiger later said that it would not surrender its China qualifier win and hoped that FACEIT would could reach a "verdict with fair play in mind." FACEIT administrators also realized that three of Fierce Tiger's four matches resulted in forfeits, with the other match being a 16–0 against Team MAX, making a possibility of a denial-of-service attack or match fixing likely. After speculations arose about the mysterious new fifth player Fierce Tiger brought on to the team who went by the alias "tbgirl", FACEIT learned and eventually confirmed with Valve that "tbgirl" was actually a player named Kun "LEo" Hou. LEo had recently been banned by Valve with a VAC ban. A VAC ban is an official ban by Valve if a player is caught cheating with Valve's anti-cheat system and any player with a VAC ban would be ineligible to play at a Valve-sponsored tournament and would last a lifetime. Fierce Tiger tried to hide "LEo"'s new identity and knowingly let the banned player play. In the end, FACEIT disqualified Fierce Tiger and Roar eSports would face off against VG.Flash in the final.

Teams
 Renegades 
 TyLoo 
 5Power Club 
 B.O.O.T-dream[S]cape 
 SCARZ Absolute 
 Uniquestars 
 Tainted Minds 
 ViCi.Flash Gaming 

Bracket

CIS Minor
The CIS Minor ran from July 10 to July 13. All eight teams in the CIS Minor came from the closed qualifier. In the closed qualifier, eight teams were invited and another eight teams qualified from four separate open qualifiers. The closed qualifier was a sixteen team, best of three, Swiss system format and the top eight teams moved on to the CIS Minor.

Before the Minor even started, Nemiga Gaming was denied visas to the United Kingdom, so the team was unable to attend the Minor. Instead of finding a replacement, FACEIT decided to run the event with seven teams. Visa denial issues also forced two additional teams (PLINK-TECH and Monolith Gaming) to play with stand-ins. This Minor was notable in that it would be the first Major in which Yegor "markeloff" Markelov would not participate in after his FlipSid3 Tactics team lost to three unknown teams in the CIS closed qualifier.

Teams
 HellRaisers 
 Team Spirit 
 AVANGAR 

 pro100 
 forZe 
 PLINK-TECH 
 Monolith Gaming 

Bracket

Europe Minor
The Europe Minor ran from July 19 to July 22. The Europe Minor will be exactly like the CIS Minor. All eight teams in the Europe Minor will come from the closed qualifier. In the closed qualifier, eight teams will be invited and another eight teams will qualify from four separate open qualifiers. The closed qualifier will be a sixteen team, best of three, Swiss system format and the top eight teams move on to the Europe Minor. Notably, Ninjas in Pyjamas were able to qualify for a Major for the first time in over two years.

Teams
 OpTic Gaming 
 Team Kinguin 
 ENCE eSports 
 Ninjas in Pyjamas 
 Red Reserve 
 3DMAX 
 LeftOut 
 Sprout Esports 

Bracket

Americas Minor
The Americas Minor ran from July 7 to July 11. Unlike the previous America Minors, no team was directly invited to the Americas Minor. This time, six teams will come from the North American closed qualifier and two teams will come from the South American open qualifier. In the North American closed qualifier, eight teams will be invited and another eight teams will come from four separate open qualifiers. These teams will play in a sixteen teams, best of three Swiss system format and the top six teams will move on to the Americas Minor. The South American open will have two open qualifiers and each will be a single elimination, 1024 team bracket.

Teams
 compLexity Gaming 
 NRG Esports 
  
 Rogue 
 Team Dignitas 
 Swole Patrol 
 Não Tem Como 
 Furia eSports 

Bracket

Broadcast talent
Desk host
 Alex "Machine" Richardson
Stage host
 Freya Spiers
Interviewer
 Pala Gilroy Sen
Commentators
 James Bardolph
 Anders Blume
 Henry "HenryG" Greer
 Vince Hill
 Daniel "ddk" Kapadia
 Jason "moses" O'Toole
 Matthew "Sadokist" Trivett
Analysts
 Chad "SPUNJ" Burchill
 Sean "seang@res" Gares
 Björn "THREAT" Pers
 Damian "daps" Steele
 Jacob "Pimp" Winneche
Observers
 Connor "Sliggy" Blomfield

Broadcasts
The major was streamed in various languages across Twitch. China streamed its broadcast on Douyu. Streams were also shown on FACEIT's YouTube's channel and on Steam.tv.

Teams competing

Pre-major ranking
HLTV.org rank teams based on results of teams' performances. The rankings shown below reflect the September 3, 2018 rankings.

Teams that were in the top 30 but failed to qualify for the major include NRG eSports (#9, United States), Heroic (#13, Denmark), ENCE eSports (#18, Finland), Ghost Gaming (#22, Canada), Luminosity Gaming (#23, Brazil), Imperial Esports (#24, Lithuania), AGO Esports (#25, Poland), Fragsters (#26, Denmark), AVANGAR (#27, Kazakhstan), and Team Kinguin (#28, Poland).

1Change since August 27, 2018 ranking

2Since end of ELEAGUE Boston Major

3Best major placements may not necessarily reflect teams' current rosters

New Challengers stage
The New Challengers stage took place from September 5 to September 9, 2018. The Challengers stage, also known as the Preliminary stage and formerly known as the offline qualifier, will be a sixteen team swiss tournament: after the randomly-drawn Day 1 games, teams will play other teams with the same win–loss record. Every round will consist of one game. In addition, teams will not play the same team twice unless necessary and teams will be randomly chosen for the first two rounds; afterwards, rounds three through five will use the Buchholz system, meaning that seeding will take place for next matchups. In addition, round five matchups will be a best of three rather than a best of one. Any team with three wins would qualify for the New Legends stage, and any team with three losses would be eliminated.

In the first round, teams from pool one will be matched up against teams in pool four. Teams in pool two will play teams in pool three. One team from a pool is randomly decided to face off against a randomly decided team in another pool. Teams in pool one are Gambit Esports, Space Soldiers, Vega Squadron, and a randomly decided team among Astralis, BIG, and Team Liquid. Teams in pool two are the two other teams from Astralis, BIG, and Team Liquid; North; and Virtus.pro. Teams in pool three are the Minor winners: Renegades, HellRaisers, Ninjas in Pyjamas, and compLexity Gaming. Teams in pool four are the Minor runner-ups: TyLoo, Team Spirit, OpTic Gaming, and Rogue.

In the second round, the winners in the first round will face each other in the "high" matches, in which teams with a 1–0 record will play against each other; the losers will face each other in the "low" matches, in which teams with a 0–1 record will play each other.

In the third round, the winners of the high matches (teams with 2-0 records) from round two will face each other. The winners of these two matches will qualify for the major. The losers of the high round and the winners of the low round (teams with 1-1 records) will face each other in the "mid" matches. The losers from the previous low matches (teams with 0-2 records) will face each other in round three's low matches. The losers of these low matches are eliminated. Twelve teams remain in the Challengers stage.

In the fourth round, the losers of the high matches and the winners of the mid matches (teams with 2-1 records) will face each other in round four's high matches. The winners of those high matches qualify for the next phase of the Major. The losers of the mid matches and the winners of the low matches (teams with 1-2 records) will face each other in the low matches of round four. The losers of these matches are eliminated from the Major. Six teams remain.

In the last round, the remaining teams will face off (teams with 2-2 records). The winners of these matches will qualify for the New Legends stage and the losing teams will be eliminated from the Major. Instead of a best of one, these games will be a best of three. In the most ideal of situations, the Swiss format should allow teams to have a harder time each time they win and have an easier time each time they lose.

{| class="wikitable" style="text-align: center;"
|-
! width="20px"  | Place
! width="400px" | Team
! width="50px"  | Record
! width="30px"  | RD
! width="260px" | Round 1
! width="260px" | Round 2
! width="260px" | Round 3
! width="260px" | Round 4
! width="260px" | Round 5
|-
| rowspan="2"| 
|  Team Liquid
| 3-0
| +20
| style="background: #D0F0C0;" | OpTic Gaming16-4Mirage
| style="background: #D0F0C0;" | High matchHellRaisers16-9Inferno
| style="background: #D0F0C0;" | High matchVega Squadron19-17Cache
| style="background: #D0F0C0;" | New Legends stage
| style="background: #D0F0C0;" | New Legends stage
|-
|  Ninjas in Pyjamas
| 3-0
| +17
| style="background: #D0F0C0;" | Virtus.pro16-5Mirage
| style="background: #D0F0C0;" | High matchTyLoo16-12Train
| style="background: #D0F0C0;" | High matchAstralis28-26Mirage
| style="background: #D0F0C0;" | New Legends stage
| style="background: #D0F0C0;" | New Legends stage
|-
| rowspan="3"| 
|  Astralis
| 3-1
| +26
| style="background: #D0F0C0;" | compLexity Gaming16-4Inferno
| style="background: #D0F0C0;" | High matchRogue16-13Inferno
| style="background: #FFCCCC;" | High matchNinjas in Pyjamas26-28Mirage
| style="background: #D0F0C0;" | High matchTeam Spirit16-3Dust II
| style="background: #D0F0C0;" | New Legends stage
|-
|  compLexity Gaming
| 3-1
| +1
| style="background: #FFCCCC;" | Astralis4-16Inferno
| style="background: #D0F0C0;" | Low matchSpace Soldiers16-11Inferno
| style="background: #D0F0C0;" | Mid matchBIG16-12Inferno
| style="background: #D0F0C0;" | High matchVega Squadron19-15Inferno
| style="background: #D0F0C0;" | New Legends stage
|-
|  HellRaisers
| 3-1
| -1
| style="background: #D0F0C0;" | North19-17Overpass
| style="background: #FFCCCC;" | High matchTeam Liquid9-16Inferno
| style="background: #D0F0C0;" | Mid matchGambit Esports16-14Overpass
| style="background: #D0F0C0;" | High matchOpTic Gaming25-23Train
| style="background: #D0F0C0;" | New Legends stage
|-
| rowspan="3"| 
|  BIG
| 3-2
| +23
| style="background: #D0F0C0;" | Renegades16-6Overpass
| style="background: #FFCCCC;" | High matchVega Squadron16-19Train
| style="background: #FFCCCC;" | Mid matchcompLexity Gaming12-16Inferno
| style="background: #D0F0C0;" | Low matchGambit Esports16-8Nuke
| style="background: #D0F0C0;" | OpTic Gaming2-0
|-
|  Vega Squadron
| 3-2
| +10
| style="background: #D0F0C0;" | Team Spirit16-14Mirage
| style="background: #D0F0C0;" | High matchBIG19-16Train
| style="background: #FFCCCC;" | High matchTeam Liquid17-19Cache
| style="background: #FFCCCC;" | High matchcompLexity Gaming15-19Inferno
| style="background: #D0F0C0;" | North2-0
|-
|  TyLoo
| 3-2
| +8
| style="background: #D0F0C0;" | Gambit Esports 19-17Inferno
| style="background: #FFCCCC;" | High matchNinjas in Pyjamas16-12Train
| style="background: #FFCCCC;" | Mid matchOpTic Gaming26-28Inferno
| style="background: #D0F0C0;" | Low matchRenegades16-10Inferno
| style="background: #D0F0C0;" | Team Spirit2-0
|-
| rowspan="3"| 
|  North
| 2-3
| -4
| style="background: #FFCCCC;" | HellRaisers17-19Overpass
| style="background: #FFCCCC;" | Low matchTeam Spirit13-16Nuke
| style="background: #D0F0C0;" | Low matchVirtus.pro16-6Mirage
| style="background: #D0F0C0;" | Low matchRogue25-23Inferno
| style="background: #FFCCCC;" | Vega Squadron0-2
|-
|  Team Spirit
| 2-3
| -6
| style="background: #FFCCCC;" | Vega Squadron14-16Mirage
| style="background: #D0F0C0;" | Low matchNorth16-13Nuke
| style="background: #D0F0C0;" | Mid matchRogue16-4Overpass
| style="background: #FFCCCC;" | High matchAstralis3-16Dust II
| style="background: #FFCCCC;" | TyLoo0-2
|-
|  OpTic Gaming
| 2-3
| -21
| style="background: #FFCCCC;" | Team Liquid4-16Mirage
| style="background: #D0F0C0;" | Low matchVirtus.pro16-13Mirage
| style="background: #D0F0C0;" | Mid matchTyLoo28-26Inferno
| style="background: #FFCCCC;" | High matchHellRaisers23-25Train
| style="background: #FFCCCC;" | BIG0-2
|-
| rowspan="3"| 
|  Gambit Esports
| 1-3
| -6
| style="background: #FFCCCC;" | Tyloo17-19Inferno
| style="background: #D0F0C0;" | Low matchRenegades16-10Train
| style="background: #FFCCCC;" | Mid matchHellRaisers14-16Overpass
| style="background: #FFCCCC;" | Low matchBIG8-16Nuke
| style="background: #FFCCCC;" | Eliminated
|-
|  Rogue
| 1-3
| -11
| style="background: #D0F0C0;" | Space Soldiers16-10Inferno
| style="background: #FFCCCC;" | High matchAstralis13-16Inferno
| style="background: #FFCCCC;" | Mid matchTeam Spirit4-16Overpass
| style="background: #FFCCCC;" | Low matchNorth23-25Inferno
| style="background: #FFCCCC;" | Eliminated
|-
|  Renegades
| 1-3
| -18
| style="background: #FFCCCC;" | BIG6-16Overpass
| style="background: #FFCCCC;" | Low matchGambit Esports10-16Train
| style="background: #D0F0C0;" | Low matchSpace Soldiers19-15Inferno
| style="background: #FFCCCC;" | Low matchTyLoo10-16Inferno
| style="background: #FFCCCC;" | Eliminated
|-
| rowspan="2"| 
|  Space Soldiers
| 0-3
| -15
| style="background: #FFCCCC;" | Rogue10-16Inferno
| style="background: #FFCCCC;" | Low matchcompLexity Gaming11-16Inferno
| style="background: #FFCCCC;" | Low matchRenegades15-19Inferno
| style="background: #FFCCCC;" | Eliminated
| style="background: #FFCCCC;" | Eliminated
|-
|  Virtus.pro
| 0-3
| -24
| style="background: #FFCCCC;" | Ninjas in Pyjamas5-16Mirage| style="background: #FFCCCC;" | Low matchOpTic Gaming13-16Mirage| style="background: #FFCCCC;" | Low matchNorth6-16Mirage| style="background: #FFCCCC;" | Eliminated
| style="background: #FFCCCC;" | Eliminated
|}

New Legends stage
The New Legends stage, formerly known as the Group stage, used the same format as the Challengers stage. This stage takes place from September 12 to September 16, 2018.

Cloud9, FaZe Clan, Natus Vincere, and MIBR were teams in pool one based on their top four placement at the Boston Major. Fnatic, G2 Esports, and Winstrike Team were teams in pool two based on their quarterfinals finish at the Boston Major. Team Liquid and Ninjas in Pyjamas were placed in a third pool for going undefeated in the New Challengers stage. Astralis, compLexity Gaming, and HellRaisers were in a fourth pool after going 3–1. BIG, TyLoo, and Vega Squadron were in a fifth pool for going 3–2. The two teams in pool three were randomly drawn to play two teams from pool two. Two randomly selected teams from pool four were drawn to play the other two teams from pool two. The remaining team from pool four was matched against a randomly selected team from pool one. The three teams from pool five were randomly selected to play a randomly selected team from the three remaining teams in pool one.

New Champions stage
The New Champions Stage was a best-of-three single elimination bracket, with teams playing until a winner was decided. This stage took place at the Wembley Arena between September 20, 2018 and September 23, 2018. Brackets were revealed shortly after MIBR defeated NIP in the last map of the group stages. Teams were seeded first based on their record in the New Legends stage and then based on strength of schedule.

Bracket

Quarterfinals
BIG vs. Natus VincereCasters: James Bardolph & ddkcompLexity Gaming vs. MIBRCasters: HenryG & SadokistTeam Liquid vs. HellRaisersCasters: HenryG & Vince HillAstralis vs. FaZe ClanCasters: Anders Blume & mosesSemifinals
Natus Vincere vs. MIBRCasters: Anders Blume & mosesTeam Liquid vs. AstralisCasters: HenryG & SadokistFinalsCasters: James Bardolph & ddk''

No official MVP was given, but HLTV.org deemed dev1ce as the MVP. Astralis became the fourth squad to win multiple Major titles.

Final standings
The final placings are shown below. In addition, the prize distribution, seed for the next major, roster, and coaches are shown. Each team's in-game leader is shown first.

Post-Major rankings
The rankings shown below reflect the September 24, 2018 rankings, the first ranking after the Major.

1Change since September 3, 2018 ranking

2Winstrike Team released four players. HLTV.org requires at least three members of a team to be included in the rankings.

Notes

References

2018 first-person shooter tournaments
2018 sports events in London
Counter-Strike: Global Offensive Majors